St. Lawrence's Chapel (Polish: Kaplica św. Wawrzyńca; Czech: Kaple Sv. Vavřince; German: Laurentius Kapelle) – a Roman Catholic chapel located on the peak of Śnieżka; in Poland. The chapel is located in south-west of Poland, in the eastern Karkonosze Mountains, on the peak of Śnieżka – the highest peak of the Karkonosze Mountains, located around 5.3 kilometres west of the centre of Karpacz.

History

The construction of the chapel was founded by Count Christof Leopold von Schaffgotsch, as a votive offering to the confiscated wealth of his father. The building of the chapel on Śnieżka was done so to enforce his right to the mountain, which was impeached by Count Czernin. The construction of the chapel on the peak of Śnieżka began in 1665. The construction works were led by architect Bartłomiej Nantwig from Gryfów Śląski. To build the foundation of the chapel, 4.5 metres of debris was removed, together with rock scree to get to a resistant rock base. The chapel was completed in 1681, with the chapel's altar taken from Krzeszów. The chapel was consecrated on August 10, St. Lawrence's Day, in 1681, by the Abbot of Krzeszów Abbey, Bernard Rosa. A regular mass service took place in the chapel until 1810. The chapel on Śnieżka was the first filial church in Miłków, referenced in a visitation protocol in 1687. The Cistercians took control of the chapel until the secularisation of law in 1810. Between 1810 and 1850, the chapel lost its sacramental function, during which the Baroque altar was moved to St. Anne's Chapel in Sosnówka. The building began to function as a mountain hut. The chapel was restored in 1850, by Friedrich Sommer, which returned the chapel's sacramental function. The chapel was re-consecrated in 1850, by Bishop of Wrocław Heinrich Förster. The regularity of sacramental practices was also restored. In 1981, the chapel celebrated its 300-year, with its construction unchanged to the present day.

References

External links
 Kaplica św. Wawrzyńca - Kaple Sv. Vavrince, St. Laurentius Kapelle na portalu polska-org.pl 

Roman Catholic churches completed in 1681
Roman Catholic chapels in Poland
Śnieżka
1681 establishments in Europe
17th-century Roman Catholic church buildings in Poland